The Żejtun Batteries were a series of artillery batteries in Żejtun, Malta, built by Maltese insurgents during the French blockade of 1798–1800. They were part of a chain of batteries, redoubts and entrenchments encircling the French positions in Marsamxett and the Grand Harbour.

At least six small batteries were built:
Della Croce Battery: This was located close to the parish church.
Tal-Caspio Batteries: These were two batteries located close to St. Clement's Church. They were armed with two 8-pounder cannon.
Tal-Fax Batteries: These were three batteries located close to St. Gregory's Church. They guarded the road to Marsaskala.
The architect Michele Cachia had a leading role in the construction of the batteries.

The Żejtun Batteries, like the other French blockade fortifications, were probably demolished soon after the end of the blockade. No traces of any of the batteries has survived. However, a cannon used in one of the batteries still survives and is now found on the side of the Parish Church of the city, next to the Olive Tree Millennium Monument.

References

Batteries in Malta
Żejtun
Military installations established in 1798
Demolished buildings and structures in Malta
French occupation of Malta
Vernacular architecture in Malta
Limestone buildings in Malta
1798 establishments in Malta
18th-century fortifications
18th Century military history of Malta